Shulamit Nadler (1923-2016) was a prominent Israeli modernist architect best known for her design of the National Library of Israel.

Life 
Shulamit Knibski  was born in Tel Aviv on August 16, 1923 to Rachel and Yitzhak Kanev.

Knibski trained at the Technion under Zeev Rechter; she was the second woman to complete an architectural degree at the school. At Technion, she met Michael Nadler, who became her husband and longtime architectural partner after her graduation.

In 1970, Nadler won the Rokach Prize.

Shulamit Nadler died in 2016 at the age of 93.

Work 

 Beit Sokolov, Tel Aviv, 1948
 Israeli Agricultural Bank, Tel Aviv, 1925
 National Library of Israel, Jerusalem, 1956
 Jerusalem Theatre, Jerusalem, designed 1958

References 

Israeli women architects
1923 births
2016 deaths
20th-century Israeli architects
21st-century architects
People from Tel Aviv
Technion – Israel Institute of Technology alumni